Arisaema section Tenuipistillata is a section of the genus Arisaema.

Description
Plants in this section are deciduous with subglobose tubers, with 1–2 pedate or palmate leaves.

Distribution
Plants from this section are found from China through the Himalayas to Afghanistan, Pakistan, and Bangladesh.

Species
Arisaema section Tenuipistillata comprises the following species:

References

Plant sections